Touggourt (or 'the gate') is a city and commune, former sultanate and capital of Touggourt District, in Touggourt Province, Algeria, built next to an oasis in the Sahara. As of the 2008 census, the commune had a population of 39,409 people, up from 32,940 in 1998, and an annual growth rate of 1.8%. Touggourt's urban area includes the communes of Nezla, Tebesbest and Zaouia El Abidia, for a total population of 146,108.

Touggourt is notable for its date trees. It was formerly surrounded by a moat, which the French filled up. Bradt Travel Guides describe it as "largely a modern town of block architecture" and "largely unattractive. The centre is quiet most of the day due to the heat but is more active at night when people take to the streets."

History 
In 1414 the Sultanate of Tuggert was founded in southern Algeria. The known Sultans (and one female ruler) were:

Ali II 
Mabruk (Mubarak)
Ali III 
Mustafa 
Sulayman III 
1729 Ahmad II 
Muhammad I al-‘Akhal 
Ahmad IV 
Farhat 
Ibrahim
Abd al-Qadir I (1st time) + Ahmad V
Khalid 
Abd al-Qadir I (2nd time)
Umar bin Bu-Kumetin
1756 Muhammad II
Umar II bin Muhammad
Ahmad VI
Abd al-Qadir II
Farhat II
1792 Ibrahim II
1804 al-Khazan 
1804 Muhammad III 
1822 ‘Amar (‘Amir) II
1830 Ibrahim III
1831 ‘Ali IV bin al-Kabir
1833 ‘Aisha (Aichouch) (female)
1840 ‘Abd ar-Rahman
1852 ‘Abd al-Qadir III
1852 - 1854 Sulayman IV 

The Tuggurt Expedition (1552) is also a notable historical event.

In 1854 the sultanate was abolished by French colonial authorities in Algeria. 

 
Tuggert became part of Oasis (prefecture seat Ouargla).

Geography 
Touggourt lies on the western side of an extensive system of oases which supports palm plantations and other agriculture in an area  from north to south. Other towns around the oases are Sidi Slimane and Megarine to north, and Tamacine and Balidat Ameur to the south. The system is also associated with more oases further north in El Oued Province including the towns of Djamaa and El M'Ghair. Beyond the oases, the land is arid and barren, with extensive sand dunes both to the west and east of the city.

Climate 
Touggourt has a hot desert climate (Köppen climate classification BWh), with long, extremely hot summers and short, warm winters. Average high temperatures are consistently over 40 °C (104 °F) during June, July, August and September and reach a maximum of nearly 45 °C (113 °F) in July. Average low temperatures in summer are also very high, above 26 °C (82.4 °F) and routinely above 29 °C (86 °F) in the hottest month. Average annual rainfall is around 55 mm (2,16 in) and summers are especially dry.

Transportation 
It is connected by railway to Biskra and is served by the Sidi Madhi Airport.

The N3 highway connects to Megarine, Sidi Slimane, and Biskra to the north and Hassi Messaoud and Illizi to the south. The N16 connects to Taibet and El Oued to the east. Another road, the Route Messaad Tougourt, connects to Messaâd and Djelfa to the northwest. Local roads connect to nearby towns Megarine and Tamacine.

Localities 

The commune is composed of nine localities:

Quartier de Mestaoua
Sidi Abdessalem
Baalouche
Chateau d'eau
Emir Abdelkader
La gare
Sidi Bouaziz
Zone Industrielle
Nouvelle Zone d'Activité

References

Sources and external links
 WorldStatesmen - Algeria - Tuggert

Neighbouring towns and cities

Oases of Algeria
Communes of Ouargla Province
History of the Sahara
Cities in Algeria